The Lure of the Grand Canyon is a classical music album by Andre Kostelanetz and his orchestra. It featured a guest spoken-word appearance by country singer Johnny Cash. It was released in 1961 (see 1961 in music) by Columbia Records.

The album consists primarily of a recording of Ferde Grofé's Grand Canyon Suite, conducted by Andre Kostelanetz, and includes authentic sounds recorded in the Grand Canyon itself. A spoken commentary by Cash makes up the 13-minute-long sixth and last track, preceded by the five movements of the suite, and describes a day spent visiting the famous canyon.

Track listing

External links
 Johnny Cash discography listing at LP Discography

Johnny Cash albums
1961 albums
Concept albums
Columbia Records albums
Works about the Grand Canyon